Bill Thomas is a Democratic Party member of the Montana House of Representatives, representing District 26 since 2007. He previously served from 1997 through 2004.

External links
Montana House of Representatives - Bill Thomas official MT State Legislature website
Project Vote Smart - Representative Bill Thomas (MT) profile
Follow the Money - Bill Thomas
2008 2006 2002 2000 campaign contributions

Members of the Montana House of Representatives
1935 births
Living people
Northwestern University Dental School alumni
Montana State University alumni